Azerbaijan has participated in the Eurovision Song Contest 14 times since making its debut in , after İctimai Televiziya (İTV) became an active member of the European Broadcasting Union (EBU). İTV had broadcast the Eurovision Song Contest in previous years, purchasing broadcasting rights from the EBU. Azerbaijan was the last country in the Caucasus to debut in the contest and the first to win.

Azerbaijan won the contest in 2011, with Ell and Nikki and the song "Running Scared" setting the record for the lowest average score for a winning song under the 12-points voting system, with 5.26 points per country. The country achieved five consecutive top-five results in the contest between 2009 and 2013, finishing third (2009) and fifth (2010) before their 2011 win and fourth (2012) and second (2013) following their win. In 2018, Azerbaijan failed to advance from the semi-finals for the first and to date only time.

History 
Prior to Azerbaijan's debut, broadcaster AzTV expressed interest in participating in 2007, but EBU rules did not allow this as AzTV was not an active member of the EBU. AzTV was denied active EBU membership on 18 June 2007, as it was considered too connected to the Azerbaijani government. On 5 July, İTV became a full EBU member, and on 15 October, it was given permission to take part in the contest by the EBU.

Azerbaijan's debut at Eurovision in 2008 proved to be successful, with Elnur and Samir placing 8th with 132 points. In 2009, Azerbaijan achieved an improvement on their 2008 debut, coming third and receiving 207 points with the song "Always" by Aysel and Arash.

With their entry only receiving 5.26 points per voting country, Azerbaijan holds the record of the lowest average score for a winning song under that voting system (in place from 1975 to 2015).

The country managed another two consecutive top five results, with Sabina Babayeva finishing fourth with 150 points in 2012, and Farid Mammadov second with 234 in 2013, but in 2014, Azerbaijan failed to place in the top ten for the first time since their debut, finishing 22nd, the country's lowest result in a Eurovision final to date. Azerbaijan has since failed to reach the top ten on five occasions, coming 12th in 2015, 17th in 2016, 14th in 2017, 20th in 2021 and 16th in 2022. 2018 saw Azerbaijan's first non-qualification, with "X My Heart" by Aisel failing to progress from the first semi-final. In 2019, Chingiz brought Azerbaijan back in the top ten for the first time since 2013 by finishing eighth with the song "Truth".

Popularity of the contest 
Since Azerbaijan's debut in 2008, the contest has been extremely popular in the country. After placing in the top 10 at its debut in 2008 and also ending in the top 5 from 2009 to 2013, the contest became a matter of "national pride". The high importance of the contest within the country became evident in 2013, when the Azerbaijani president Ilham Aliyev launched an inquiry into his country failing to award Russia any points in the 2013 final. Since 2009, the contest has consistently been the most watched show on Azerbaijani television, despite the fact that the contest is broadcast at midnight local time due to the time difference from Central European Time. Azerbaijan issued a postage stamp dedicated to Ell and Nikki's win in 2011.

The country spent  on hosting the 2012 contest, including building a completely new arena for the event.  this is the largest amount of money ever spent by any host country on organising the contest.

Participation overview

Hostings

Awards received

Marcel Bezençon Awards

Related involvement

Heads of delegation

Commentators and spokespersons

Stage directors

Photogallery

See also 
 Armenia–Azerbaijan relations in the Eurovision Song Contest
 Azerbaijan in the Eurovision Dance Contest
 Azerbaijan in the Junior Eurovision Song Contest
 Azerbaijan in the Turkvision Song Contest

Notes

References

External links 
 Eldar & Nigar – Eurovision 2011 Winners (official video)
 Eldar & Nigar – Azerbaijani entry for the Eurovision Song Contest 2011 in Düsseldorf, Germany
 Safura – Azerbaijani entry for the Eurovision Song Contest 2010 in Oslo, Norway
 Eurovision AzerbaijanEurovision Azerbaijan
 Points to and from Azerbaijan eurovisioncovers.co.uk

 
Countries in the Eurovision Song Contest